Richmond Hill Tunnel is a railway tunnel to the east of Leeds city centre, in West Yorkshire, England. The tunnel is known to be the first in the world specifically designed to carry passengers to be worked by steam trains rather than a stationary engine. One of the innovative methods employed to reassure passengers going through the lightless tunnel, was to place copper sheets underneath the air shafts which were intended to reflect the light around the tunnel.

The railway line through Richmond Hill is part of the TransPennine Line which connects Manchester and Leeds, with Selby, York and Hull.

History
These gained support due to the state of the roads and the monopoly of the canal-owners who were perceived as doing little in the way of improvement. The initial survey between Leeds and Selby was undertaken by George Stephenson, who recommended three inclined planes with stationary engines on the first  out from Leeds. A later survey, undertaken by James Walker, preferred the use of a tunnel underneath Richmond Hill, and the use of steam locomotives throughout. Walker himself stated in his report that 

Building of the route started in October 1830, with work on the tunnel starting on 5 November 1831. Initially, there was a delay when the proposal of moving the Leeds terminus was considered. This would have meant avoiding the necessity of a tunnel, as the station at Leeds would be further west than the tunnel, rather than just north of it. The route cut under Richmond Hill was difficult to construct due to the presence of previous coal mining activities in the hill. To enhance this, the contractors placed "sheets of tinned copper",  square on the space between the two sets of rails at the bottom of each shaft. This was to help reflect the light cast downward, and to alleviate the gloom further, the walls of the tunnel were whitewashed. A reporter from the Leeds Mercury visited the construction, commenting on the "Herculean" strengths of the workers and claiming that a newspaper could be read within the tunnel due to the amount of reflected light.

However, because passengers had not regularly been through tunnels, some were worried about the "stygian depths". One traveller wrote about a journey through the tunnel: "We were immediately enveloped in total darkness, and every one of the carriages filled with smoke and steam to a most annoying degree. Though we were but a few minutes going through, such was the nuisance, we thought it an hour." The engineer, James Walker, appreciated the need to retain the downward shafts, not only for the light they produced, but also the need to ventilate smoke from the tunnel.

The tunnel was completed in June 1833, though the opening of the line did not occur until September 1834. The inside of the tunnel was laid with two courses of bricks aligned lengthways along the tunnel, but where shale was located, three courses of brickwork were necessary for the extra support. The tunnel was shaped in a slight concave construction, this meant that the width at the springing line (the bottom of the arch), was wider than the width of the tunnel mouth at the rail level. The tunnel mouths were designed with large stone facings, and an open excavation with a "strong wall" of  led up to the western portal of the tunnel mouth. These were not only designed to impress the passengers, but also to reassure them about travelling through the tunnel.

The tunnel was known to be the first that was designed for steam locomotives to work through (although early suggestions mooted horses), and the tunnel was also noted for being the first in the world for which passengers were meant to be taken through. In 1840, all passenger traffic was diverted away from Leeds Marsh Lane railway station by George Hudson, who had leased the Leeds and Selby Railway. Freight was similarly diverted away in 1848, with the reason being that Marsh Lane was an isolated terminus, the Hunslet Lane terminus of the Y&NMR was nearer to Leeds city centre.

Plans were deposited by the North Eastern Railway (NER) in 1891 to widen the tunnel to accommodate more lines, and also remove much of the tunnel and create a cutting at a cost of over £290,000. Work started in December 1892, and a report in the Huddersfield Chronicle states that two workers were crushed to death when a new bridge was being built to replace the road that previously crossed above the now opened out tunnel. By November 1893, seven deaths had been attributed to the opening out works and more than a dozen injuries had occurred. All news reports and official updates issued by the North Eastern Railway referred to the two formations as Marsh Lane Tunnel and Marsh Lane Cutting rather than Richmond Hill. 

Throughout the works, most traffic was diverted, but a single line was kept open which was protected by a timber frame, allowing the old tunnel and hill to be taken down. The work to shorten the tunnel, widen and lengthen the cutting, was completed in 1895. The NER built replacement houses for those above the old tunnel structure which needed to be demolished for the opening out works. The removal of the tunnel left the cutting with several bridges crossing it, many of which are still in use today.

The current 'tunnel' area of Richmond Hill is listed as being , (or ), with five lines running through the tunnel and Marsh Lane Cutting, which was part of the tunnel before it was opened out. Four of the lines are electrified, and the fifth is a goods loop to a stone terminal on the original site of Marsh Lane terminus. The lines through the tunnel and cutting were electrified at 25kV in 1989, as part of the East Coast Main Line electrification scheme, and allow for empty stock transfers between Leeds railway station, and the depot at Neville Hill. Besides allowing trains access and egress from the depot at Neville Hill, the line is an important passenger line for TransPennine Express trains.

References

Sources

External links
Listing at railwaycodes.org
Image of the cutting looking south eastwards

Railway tunnels in England
Rail transport in West Yorkshire
Tunnels completed in 1834
Leeds
Tunnels in West Yorkshire